Luther Rackley, Jr. (June 11, 1946 - November 19, 2017) was an American professional basketball player who played six seasons in the National Basketball Association (NBA), and the American Basketball Association (ABA).

Early life
Rackley was born in Bainbridge, Georgia and grew up in Troy, New York, where he attended Troy High School. In his senior season at Troy, Rackley led the team in scoring and rebounding as the Flying Horses went 22-0. The team earned a ranking of No. 1 in the nation from a University of Kentucky scout, and Rackley was named All-American. During his junior and senior seasons, Troy won 38 of 40 games, two Class A league championships and a pair of Section II Class A titles. The entire team was inducted into the Capital District Hall of Fame in 2011.

College career
Rackley played college basketball at Xavier University in Cincinnati, Ohio. As a sophomore starting center, he averaged 15.0 points and 12.6 rebounds per game. He had a season-high 25 points against both the University of Utah and St. Bonaventure University and its All-American center Bob Lanier. Against the University of Detroit, he posted 24 points and 19 rebounds, and he snared 25 rebounds against the University of Dayton.

In his junior season he was limited to seven games due to ineligibility due to his grades, and averaged 9.1 points and 8.4 rebounds per game. As a senior, Rackley came on strong with team-leading 17.5 points, 14.0 rebounds, and a .552 field goal percentage. He had a career-high 29 points in two games.

Rackley earned a bachelor's degree in American Government and Political Science.

He was inducted into the Xavier University Athletic Hall of Fame in 1982.

Professional career
Rackley was selected in the third round (37th overall) of the 1969 NBA draft by the Cincinnati Royals and by the American Basketball Association's Minnesota Pipers. He signed with the NBA's Royals. In his rookie season of 1969–70, he served primarily as the backup to starting center Connie Dierking, playing 66 games and averaging 19 minutes per game, 7.6 points and 5.7 rebounds.

On May 11, 1970 he was drafted by the Cleveland Cavaliers in the NBA expansion draft. In 1970–71 for the Cavs, he averaged just over 19 minutes per game, again averaging 7.6 points along with 5.3 rebounds per game.

In 1971–72, his third season, he played nine games for the Cavaliers, then on November 15, 1971 he was traded to the New York Knicks. He remained a backup center, and for the season averaged 3.6 points and 2.9 rebounds per game.

During the 1972–73 season, he played one game for the Knicks before being waived. He signed with the American Basketball Association Memphis Tams. There, he played in 57 games, averaging 7.3 points and 5.0 rebounds. The Knicks would go on to win the 1973 championship.

On September 28, 1973 he was claimed off waivers by the Philadelphia 76ers. He played nine games before being waived, and retiring on November 28, 1973, ending his five-year professional career.

Personal life
Rackley earned his real-estate license and worked as a real-estate broker in New York City. He served as Vice President of Walt Frazier Enterprises and organized teams consisting of NBA players to play all over the world. He served as an NBA scout and owned a casting office for commercials and films. He spent several years as a teacher in the White Plains, New York school system.

He also acted in two movies, The Last Dinosaur and The Fish That Saved Pittsburgh and was a member of the Screen Actors Guild. Rackley also appeared in several television commercials.

Rackley lived in Manhattan, New York following his retirement.

He was Catholic.

Death
Luther Rackley died on Sunday, November 19, 2017 in Harlem, New York.

References

1946 births
2017 deaths
African-American basketball players
African-American male actors
American men's basketball players
Basketball players from Georgia (U.S. state)
Basketball players from New York (state)
Centers (basketball)
Cincinnati Royals draft picks
Cincinnati Royals players
Cleveland Cavaliers players
Male actors from Georgia (U.S. state)
Male actors from New York (state)
Memphis Tams players
New York Knicks players
People from Bainbridge, Georgia
Philadelphia 76ers players
Sportspeople from Troy, New York
Xavier Musketeers men's basketball players
20th-century African-American sportspeople
21st-century African-American people
African-American Catholics